Moree Plains Shire is a local government area in the North West Slopes region of New South Wales, Australia. The northern boundary of the Shire is located adjacent to the border between New South Wales and Queensland. The Shire is located adjacent to the Newell and Gwydir Highways and the North West railway line.

The Mayor of Moree Plains Shire Council is Cr. Katrina Humphries, an independent politician.

Towns, villages and localities
The main town and seat of Council is Moree. Other towns and villages in the Shire include Ashley, Boomi, Boggabilla, Garah, Gurley, Millie, Mungindi, Pallamallawa and Weemelah.

Heritage listings
Moree has a number of heritage-listed sites, including:
 15 Gwydir Street: Alloway

Demographics
Aboriginal and Torres Strait Islander people made up 20.8 per cent of the population which is approximately nine times above both the national and state averages of 2.5 per cent. The median age of people in the Moree Plains Shire was 35 years; slightly lower than the national median of 37 years. Children aged 0 – 14 years made up 23.4 per cent of the population and people aged 65 years and over made up 12.5 per cent of the population. Of people in the area aged 15 years and over, 44.2 per cent were married and 9.9 per cent were either divorced or separated.

Between the 2001 census and the 2011 census the Moree Plains Shire experienced negative population growth in both absolute and real terms. When compared with total population growth of Australia for the same periods, being 5.78 per cent and 8.32 per cent respectively, population growth in the Moree Plains local government area was significantly lower than the national average. The median weekly income for residents within the Moree Plains Shire was generally close to the national average.

At the 2011 census, the proportion of residents in the Moree Plains local government area who stated their ancestry as Australian or Anglo-Saxon exceeded 77 per cent of all residents (national average was 65.2 per cent). In excess of 70 per cent of all residents in the Moree Plains Shire nominated a religious affiliation with Christianity at the 2011 census, which was significantly higher than the national average of 50.2 per cent. Meanwhile, as at the census date, compared to the national average, households in the Moree Plains local government area had a significantly lower than average proportion (3.6 per cent) where two or more languages are spoken (national average was 20.4 per cent); and a significantly higher proportion (89.4 per cent) where English only was spoken at home (national average was 76.8 per cent).

Selected historical census data

Council

Current composition and election method
Moree Plains Shire Council is composed of nine councillors elected proportionally as a single ward. All Councillors are elected for a fixed four-year term of office. The mayor is elected by the councillors at the first meeting of the council. The most recent election was held on 10 September 2016, and the makeup of the council is as follows:

The current Council, elected in 2016, in order of election, is:

Other

A 2011 research study reported that:
Population and employment in Moree Plains has steadily declined over the last two decades. Between 2001 and 2006 Moree Plains saw the greatest net migration change amongst the study areas with 1741 people moving out of the area
There was a corresponding decline in employment
In 2005-06 the Moree Plains economy was estimated to have a Gross Regional Product of A$605 million
The unstable economy is not conducive to investment and development, including the provision of services

The Moree Artesian Aquatics Centre (MAAC), first established in 1896, attracts visitors from around Australia and overseas to "take the waters", an activity particularly popular with immigrants from eastern and southern Europe and eastern Asia. Moree itself sits at the south-eastern extremity of the Great Artesian Basin, a vast underground water resource covering much of eastern and central Australia. The MAAC has recently undergone a $7millon redevelopment.  Along with the artesian pools and FINA standard Olympic pool, it also has a program pool, children's hidroplay area and a giant waterslide.

Moree also known as the Home of the Big Rocket.  There is 14-metre rocket and a space themed command centre playground, along with a double swing set in local Kirkby Park.  A Liberty Swing for disabled children is installed alongside the Rocket.

The Shire has a relatively high Indigenous Australian population (seventeen per cent), and in recent years has achieved recognition for its Aboriginal Employment Strategy, targeting indigenous employment in the mainstream workforce through a process of mentoring and counselling of both employer and employee.

Moree Plains Shire is the most productive agricultural Local Government area in Australia, averaging around A$1Billion per year in agricultural primary production.

Current produce includes wheat, barley, sorghum, pulses, cotton, maize, beef, sheep, wool, olives, pecans, and canola. Historically, the area has been known for also growing sunflowers. Both as a cash crop and as a polyculture crop. Though sunflower cropping has decreased, wild sunflowers are extremely abundant in the central shire.

References

External links

 
Local government areas of New South Wales
North West Slopes
New England (New South Wales)
Newell Highway